José Zurera (born 7 February 1966) is a Spanish weightlifter. He competed at the 1988 Summer Olympics and the 1992 Summer Olympics.

References

1966 births
Living people
Spanish male weightlifters
Olympic weightlifters of Spain
Weightlifters at the 1988 Summer Olympics
Weightlifters at the 1992 Summer Olympics
Sportspeople from the Province of Córdoba (Spain)
20th-century Spanish people